Oelze may refer to:

 Oelze (river) of Thuringia, Germany
 Oelze (de), a village in the municipality Katzhütte, Germany

People
 Richard Oelze (1900–1980), German painter
 Christiane Oelze (born 1963), German soprano